Job for a Cowboy is an American death metal band from Glendale, Arizona. Formed in 2003, the band's debut album Genesis was released in 2007, peaking at No. 54 on the US Billboard 200 and selling 13,000 copies in its first week of release. The second album, 2009's Ruination,  sold 10,600 copies in the United States in its first week to debut at position No. 42 on the Billboard 200 chart. The band comprises vocalist Jonny Davy, guitarists Tony Sannicandro and Al Glassman and bassist Nick Schendzielos. Davy is the only remaining founding member.

The band has played in international music festivals, including Sounds of the Underground, Download Festival, Mayhem Festival, Summer Slaughter, Graspop Metal Meeting, and Wacken Open Air.

History

Formation and Doom EP (2003–2006)
Job for a Cowboy was founded in Glendale, Arizona, during December 2003 by vocalist Jonny Davy, guitarists Ravi Bhadriraju and Andrew Arcurio, bassist Chad Staples, and drummer Andy Rysdam when the band members were no older than 15 and 16. In 2004, they created a MySpace profile, posted songs online, and immediately began to connect with several worldwide fans. Later that year, Staples and Rysdam left Job for a Cowboy and were replaced by Brent Riggs and Elliott Sellers, respectively, as bassist and drummer. Traffic to the band's MySpace profile increased exponentially in late 2005 when the band released their first EP, Doom. The EP attracted the attention of Arizona independent label King of the Monsters, who distributed the disc after an initial self-released pressing by the band.  The EP release helped the band win the award for Best Metal Band at the Third Annual Arizona Ska Punk Awards Ceremony in Phoenix, Arizona.

Job for a Cowboy extensively promoted their EP, including three performances on the Sounds of the Underground tour. By the end of the year, the band obtained professional management and signed a deal with Metal Blade Records, who reissued Doom with a bonus track. During the same year, 2006, Arcurio left the band and Bobby Thompson joined the group. While Job for a Cowboy was writing material for their first full-length album, Sellers announced that he was leaving the band to go back to school immediately after recording the album. In search of a permanent drummer, the band then posted a bulletin on Blabbermouth.net, which was seen by Jon "The Charn" Rice. He made a video of himself, posted it on YouTube, and sent the link to the band. Soon after, Rice joined the band.

Genesis (2007–2008)

In March 2007, Job for a Cowboy completed their debut full-length album, Genesis. It was recorded at Blue Light Audio Media in Phoenix, Arizona, with producer Cory Spotts. It was mixed by Sabbat guitarist Andy Sneap. Released on May 15, the album peaked at No. 54 on the Billboard 200 and sold nearly 13,000 copies in its first week, which made Genesis the highest-charting heavy metal debut since Slipknot's 1999 debut album. The album received generally positive reviews, with Kerrang! magazine saying, "an album that quite literally obliterates everyone else currently residing within the death and grind scenes" and "one of the year's most essential metal purchases."

In June 2007, the band performed at the Download Festival in Donington Park, England. The group also played at the Sounds of the Underground festival along with Amon Amarth, Chimaira, Gwar, and Shadows Fall. In October, Job for a Cowboy co-headlined the 2007 Radio Rebellion Tour, teaming up with Behemoth, Gojira, and Beneath the Massacre. The band featured on the 2008 Gigantour with headliners Megadeth, Children of Bodom, In Flames, and High on Fire. In addition, they confirmed for a number of festivals during 2008, including Wacken Open Air in Germany and a second appearance at England's Download Festival. Job for a Cowboy embarked on a U.S. headlining tour in November and December 2008 with supporting acts Hate Eternal and All Shall Perish. In 2008, Job for a Cowboy once again won the award for Best Metal Band at The Arizona Ska Punk Awards, and took home the award again the next year at the 2009 Awards Ceremony.

In late 2008, guitarist Ravi Bhadriraju left Job for a Cowboy to return to school because he wanted to pursue a more rewarding career in the medical field. He was replaced with former Despised Icon guitarist Al Glassman.

Ruination and Gloom (2009–2011)
On May 1, 2009, the band announced that they had completed recording their second studio album, Ruination, at AudioHammer studios in Sanford, Florida, with producer Jason Suecof. The album marks the debut of guitarist Al Glassman and drummer Jon "the Charn" Rice, who had actually been with the band since the tour for Genesis. Ruination was then released on July 7, 2009, worldwide through Metal Blade Records. The album sold around 10,600 copies in the United States in its first week of release to debut at position No. 42 on the Billboard 200 chart. Job for a Cowboy participated in the second Mayhem Festival, playing on the Hot Topic stage along with bands such as Cannibal Corpse and Whitechapel.

At the beginning of 2011, the band started work on an EP which was recorded in February at the Audiohammer Studios in Sanford, Florida, with producer Jason Suecof. Just before the recording process began, bassist Brent Riggs and guitarist Bobby Thompson departed from the band and were replaced by Nick Schendzielos of Cephalic Carnage and Tony Sannicandro, respectively. On April 13, 2011, a video appeared on the internet of drummer Jon Rice performing a new song in the studio. Job for a Cowboy issued their new EP on June 7, 2011, entitled Gloom, which was only made available for purchase through mail order and digital download.

Job for a Cowboy entered Audio Hammer Studios in September 2011 to record their next effort. The group worked with the production team of Jason Suecof, Eyal Levi of Dååth, and Ronn Miller on the project.

Demonocracy and Sun Eater (2012–2016)

On February 21, 2012, Job for a Cowboy released their first single from their new album Demonocracy, titled "Nourishment Through Bloodshed." It was released via Metal Blade Records' YouTube channel.

On March 20, Job for a Cowboy premiered the song "Black Discharge," and, on April 2, the song "Imperium Wolves." Demonocracy was released on April 10, 2012, and had first-week sales reaching 4,900, which charted at 87 on the Billboard 200. That summer they were a part of the Summer Slaughter tour with acts such as Cannibal Corpse, Between the Buried and Me, and The Faceless.

On October 21, 2013, the band announced they were recording their fourth full-length album. The band's drummer, Jon "The Charn" Rice, announced eight days after the album announcement that he was departing the band. It was announced on February 5, 2014, that he had joined hard rock band Scorpion Child.

On September 23, 2014, the band announced their upcoming album Sun Eater, which released on November 11 via Metal Blade. The band also released their first single from the album titled "Sun of Nihility." The second single released off of Sun Eater was the song "Eating the Visions of God."

On January 22, 2016, it was announced that drummer Jon "The Charn" Rice had rejoined the band for a one-off show. Whether he has rejoined on a permanent basis has not been confirmed.

Recent activities (2016–present) 
During a 2016 Interview at NAMM Show, bassist Nick Schendzielos revealed that the band was writing new music and had four new songs at the time. He went on to say that they hope to release new music in late 2017 that would follow the musical direction of Sun Eater.

In 2019, frontman Jonny Davy, and guitarists Alan Glassman and Tony Sannicandro formed a new group called Serpent of Gnosis, alongside The Black Dahlia Murder bassist Max Lavelle and Deeds of Flesh drummer Darren Cesca.

In August 2019, it was published that Job for a Cowboy may be "plotting a legit comeback with new music (an EP) and possibly some shows" according to "sources close to the band." In May 2020, Job for a Cowboy alluded to a reunion on Twitter with a clip from the 1995 film Mortal Kombat, shortly after which producer Jason Suecof, who has mixed and engineered three of the group's full-length albums proclaimed “[vocalist] Jonny Davy just sang me the whole new album”. In June 2020, Suecof confirmed that the band will be recording new music, although production had been slowed by the COVID-19 pandemic. In September 2020, the band revealed that Navene Koperweis would be the session drummer on the band's upcoming album.

Musical style and influences
Job for a Cowboy originally started as a deathcore group, but they changed their style to death metal with the release of their first full-length album Genesis. The band has also been described as technical death metal. Job for a Cowboy has been described by The New York Times as "an Arizona band with a guttural, brute-force sound descended (indirectly) from hardcore punk" and "straightforwardly brutal act" by Rolling Stone magazine.

On the band's fourth full-length Sun Eater, Job for a Cowboy started experimenting with a more progressive writing structure and style. The album, which was called "progressive death metal", was praised for its stylistic innovation in contrast to the band's previous albums.

Job for a Cowboy's influences include Nile, Mastodon, Decapitated, Hate Eternal, Cattle Decapitation, Psycroptic, and Misery Index.

Band members

Current members
 Jonny Davy – lead vocals (2003–present)
 Al Glassman – rhythm guitar (2008–present)
 Tony Sannicandro – lead guitar, backing vocals (2011–present)
 Nick Schendzielos – bass (2011–present)

Current session members
 Navene Koperweis – drums (2020–present)

Former members
 Chad Staples – bass (2003–2004)
 Andy Rysdam – drums (2003–2004)
 Andrew Arcurio – lead guitar (2003–2006)
 Ravi Bhadriraju – rhythm guitar (2003–2008)
 Brent Riggs – bass, backing vocals (2004–2011)
 Elliott Sellers – drums (2004–2006)
 Davis Stine – lead guitar (2006–2011)
 Jon "The Charn" Rice – drums (2007–2013, 2016)

Session members
 Danny Walker – drums (2013–2014)

Timeline

Discography

Studio albums

EPs

Singles

Music videos

Concert tours
 Sounds of the Underground 2006 (2006)
 Job for a Cowboy Jan/Feb 2007 tour (January 12 – February 18, 2007)
 Unearth European headlining tour (March 21 – April 16, 2007)
 Download Festival 2007 (June 8–10, 2007)
 Radio Rebellion Tour (October 18 – November 18, 2007)
 Gigantour 3: North America (April 12 – May 22, 2008)
 Wacken Open Air 2008 (July 2008)
 Headlining Tour (November 13 – December 16, 2008)
 Mayhem Festival 2009(July 10 – August 16, 2009)
 Lamb of God Us Tour (September 16 – November 11, 2009)
 Lamb of God Europe Tour (February 9 – March 12, 2010)
 Job For A Cowboy Headlining Tour (April 21 – May 27, 2010)
 Download Festival 2010 (June 11, 2010)
 Gods of Metal 2010 (June 25, 2010)
 Graspop Metal Meeting 2010 (June 27, 2010)
 With Full Force 2010 (July 2, 2010)
 Wacken Open Air 2010 (August 6–7, 2010)
 2010 South American Tour (July 17–25, 2010)
 Ruination UK/Euro Tour 2010 (November 4–28, 2010)
 Job for a Cowboy Fall US Headline Tour (December 5–20, 2010)
 Between the Buried and Me US Tour (April 15 – May 15, 2011)
 Destroyers Of The Faith UK (March 3–11, 2012)
 Metal Alliance Tour 2012 (March 15 – April 21, 2012)
 The Summer Slaughter Tour 2012 (July 20 – August 25, 2012)
 The Womb to Waste Tour (September 14 – October 14, 2012)
 The End of the World (December 6–18, 2012)
 Bonecrusher Fest 2013 (March 1–30, 2013)
 The Divinity of Purpose 2013 Tour (April 9–21, 2013)
 Mayhem Festival 2013 (June 29 – August 4, 2013)

References

External links

 Job for a Cowboy at Metal Blade Records
 
 

American death metal musical groups
American deathcore musical groups
American technical death metal musical groups
Heavy metal musical groups from Arizona
Metal Blade Records artists
Musical groups established in 2003
Musicians from Glendale, Arizona
Musical quintets